Harristown Township is located in Macon County, Illinois, USA. As of the 2010 census, its population was 1,921 and it contained 793 housing units.

Cities and towns 
 Harristown

Adjacent townships 
 Illini Township (north)
 Hickory Point Township (northeast)
 Decatur Township (east)
 South Wheatland Township (southeast)
 Blue Mound Township (south)
 Mosquito Township, Christian County (southwest)
 Niantic Township (west and northwest)

Geography

Demographics

References

External links
City-data.com

Townships in Macon County, Illinois
1859 establishments in Illinois
Populated places established in 1859
Townships in Illinois